Skøelv Chapel is a chapel of the Church of Norway in Sørreisa Municipality in Troms og Finnmark county, Norway. It is located in the village of Skøelva. It is an annex chapel for the Sørreisa parish which is part of the Senja prosti (deanery) in the Diocese of Nord-Hålogaland. The white, wooden chapel was built in a long church style in 1966 using plans drawn up by the architect Petter Bratli. The chapel seats about 150 people.

See also
List of churches in Nord-Hålogaland

References

Sørreisa
Churches in Troms
Wooden churches in Norway
20th-century Church of Norway church buildings
Churches completed in 1966
1966 establishments in Norway
Long churches in Norway